Haysville Corner is an unincorporated community in Wayne Township, Randolph County, in the U.S. state of Indiana.

Geography

References

Unincorporated communities in Randolph County, Indiana
Unincorporated communities in Indiana